Élie Castor (born April 28, 1943 in Cayenne, French Guiana, France and died June 16, 1996 in Clermont Ferrand, France) was a French politician from French Guiana who served in the French National Assembly from 1981 to 1993, representing the Guianese Socialist Party. Before entering politics he had worked as both a teacher and a policeman.

He was the author of several books including 1981-1985 La gauche au pouvoir : Pour la Guyane : l'espoir, and a book on Félix Éboué (1984).

References

External links
 page on the French National Assembly website

1943 births
1996 deaths
People from Cayenne
French Guianan politicians
Guianese Socialist Party politicians
Deputies of the 7th National Assembly of the French Fifth Republic
Deputies of the 8th National Assembly of the French Fifth Republic
Deputies of the 9th National Assembly of the French Fifth Republic
Presidents of the General Council of French Guiana